Chauth Ka Barwara railway station is a railway station in Sawai Madhopur district, Rajasthan. Its code is CKB. It serves Chauth Ka Barwara. The station consists of 2 platforms. Passenger, Express  and Superfast trains halt here.

References

Railway stations in Sawai Madhopur district
Jaipur railway division